John Cumin may refer to:

John Cumin, prisoner on the St. Michael of Scarborough
John Comyn (bishop) or John Cumin